Royal Air Force New Romney or more simply RAF New Romney is a former Royal Air Force Advanced Landing Ground located  north east of Lydd, Kent, England.

History
RAF Romney Marsh was also known as Jesson or Littlestone Aerodrome, and was situated to the north of New Romney.
 No. 124 Airfield RAF
 No. 181 Squadron RAF flying Hawker Typhoon IB's from 3 July 1943 until 8 October 1943
 No. 182 Squadron RAF flying Hawker Typhoon IB's from 2 July 1943 until 12 October 1943 with a detachment at RAF Wigtown
 No. 247 Squadron RAF flying Hawker Typhoon IB's firstly from 10 July 1943 until 7 August 1943 then again from 13 August 1943 until 11 October 1943
 No. 3207 Servicing Commando
 No. 3209 Servicing Commando

Current use
The site is now used for farming and little remains of the landing ground.

See also
 List of former Royal Air Force stations
 Advanced Landing Ground

Notes

References

Bibliography

External links
 Advanced Landing Grounds on Romney Marsh

New Romney